A by-election was held for the Australian House of Representatives seat of Gwydir on 19 December 1953. This was triggered by the death of Country Party MP Thomas Treloar.

The by-election was won by Country Party candidate Ian Allan.

Results

References

1953 elections in Australia
New South Wales federal by-elections